Smorchkov (from сморчок, a morel) is a Russian masculine surname, its feminine counterpart is Smorchkova. It may refer to
Alexander Smorchkov (1919–1998), Soviet military pilot
Vladimir Smorchkov (born 1980), Russian weightlifter

Russian-language surnames